Todd M. France (born February 13, 1980 in Toledo, Ohio) was a placekicker in the Arena Football League. He is currently a professor at Ohio Northern University in Ada, Ohio. In the National Football League, he kicked for the Tampa Bay Buccaneers and Philadelphia Eagles.  In the Arena League, he kicked for the Philadelphia Soul, Chicago Rush, Orlando Predators, and New Orleans VooDoo.

High school
At Springfield High School, he was a Division II All-State team member, team MVP, first team All-District and All-Conference, lettered three years in football and volleyball, four years in soccer and two years in basketball.

College
He played college football at the University of Toledo where he majored in Mechanical Engineering. 

France was a nominee for Lou Groza Award as nation's best placekicker and he was the first UT kicker to make first-team All-MAC since Bruce Nichols in 1988.  He spent a season with the Rhein Fire of the now-defunct NFL Europa and played in World Bowl XI.

Peace Corps

In 2009, France joined the United States Peace Corps. He served in Azerbaijan as a Youth Development volunteer from 2009 until 2011.

1980 births
Living people
Sportspeople from Toledo, Ohio
American football placekickers
Toledo Rockets football players
Philadelphia Eagles players
Tampa Bay Buccaneers players
Philadelphia Soul players
Rhein Fire players